Field Hockey Canada (FHC) is the national sports organization responsible for the development and growth of field hockey in Canada.  In collaboration with provincial and club members, FHC provides programs and resources to support the field hockey community from the pitch to the podium.

Prior to 1991, the Canadian men’s and women’s field hockey programs were operating independently as separate national entities. The creation of Field Hockey Canada was the result of transitioning and uniting both programs under one umbrella.

National Teams include Senior Men, Senior Women, Junior Men and Junior Women.  

Approximately 18,000 Canadians play field hockey, with 9,000 participating in high school field hockey programs. Field hockey is currently played in more than 600 schools and 400 clubs across the country.

History
Field hockey arrived in Canada in the late 19th century due to the British Army which had been traveling throughout the Commonwealth nations. Eventually both men's and women's programs emerged. The modern form of field hockey was first played in Canada in British Columbia.

Women
In 1896, the first recorded match in Canada was played by Vancouver girls, and the Vancouver Ladies Club was formed. The first women's organization in Canada was formed in Vancouver in 1927.

Men
Men were playing at the turn of the century in Vancouver and Victoria, and a Vancouver League came into existence in 1902.

National Championships
In Canada, the national field hockey championships are called the FHC (Field Hockey Canada) National Championships. As of 2022 there are two separate divisions for the FHC National Championships:
 Under 18 National Championships 
 Under 16 National Championships

See also
 Field Hockey
 Bando (sport)
 Shinty
 Hurling
 Camogie

References

External links 
 Field Hockey Canada official site

Canada
Sports governing bodies in Canada
Field hockey in Canada